William Brymner,  (December 14, 1855 – June 18, 1925) was a Canadian figure and landscape painter and educator. In addition to playing a key role in the development of Impressionism in Canada, Brymner taught numerous artists who became leading figures in Canadian modern art.

Early years

Born in Greenock, Scotland, the son of Douglas Brymner the first Dominion Archivist and Jean Thomson, Brymner moved with his family to Melbourne, Canada East in 1857. In 1864, his family moved to Montreal, Canada East. They later lived in the area of Ottawa, Canada West where Brymner attended the Ottawa Grammar School.

Following architectural studies, Brymner enrolled at the Académie Julian in Paris, France, in 1878, where his instructors were William-Adolphe Bouguereau and Tony Robert-Fleury. Both of his teachers were famous exponents of 'Grand manner' naturalism. During this period at the Salon Brymner became interested in the work of Jean-Louis Ernest Meissonier, who was already popular with the French public.

In the spring of 1884, Brymner travelled to Runswick Bay, North Yorkshire, England, with the British artist Frederick W. Jackson (1859-1918) and Scottish-Canadian artist James Kerr-Lawson (1862-1939). It was there that Brymner completed his major works A Wreath of Flowers (1884), which later served as his diploma submission for the Royal Canadian Academy of Arts, and The Lonely Orphans Taken to Her Heart (1884). 

In January 1885, Brymner returned to Paris to resume his studies at the Académie Julian. During this time, he created the Barbizon school-inspired landscape painting Border of the Forest of Fontainebleau (1885), which was exhibited at the Paris Salon.

Returning to Canada in 1885, Brymner spent the summer in Baie-Saint-Paul in the Lower Saint Lawrence region of Quebec. There he created his first paintings depicting rural Quebec, a subject he frequently would return to throughout his career.

Later life

In 1886, Brymner settled in Montreal after staying in Paris "on and off for almost seven years." That year, he travelled to Western Canada via the newly completed Canadian Pacific Railway, hoping to take advantage of the fact that the CPR was commissioning landscapes of the Rocky Mountains. Brymner spent several weeks on the Siksika Nation Reserve near Gleichen (now Alberta), where he witnessed the severe hunger of the Siksika People due to the government's failure to provide adequate food rations. This experience culminated in one of Brymner's most haunting paintings, Giving Out Rations to the Blackfoot Indians, NWT (1886). 

Upon his return from Western Canada, Brymner began teaching at the Art Association of Montreal, where he would remain for thirty years. Many members of the Beaver Hall Group studied under Brymner, who encouraged them to explore new modernist approaches to painting. 

Brymner specialized in figure scenes and avoided large historical subjects except for his paintings of the Canadian Pacific Railway. Two Girls Reading of 1898 displays a careful treatment of light and an understanding of the force of a simple emphatic composition.

Pupils 

Among Brymner's pupils were:

Nora Collyer
Emily Coonan
Clarence Gagnon
Charles Gill 
Prudence Heward
Randolph Hewton
Edwin Holgate
Mabel Lockerby
John Young Johnstone
Mabel May
Helen McNicoll
Kathleen Morris
Lilias Torrance Newton
A. M. Pattison
Robert Wakeham Pilot
Sarah Robertson
Arthur Dominique Rozaire
Anne Savage
Ethel Seath

Recognition and awards

In 1883, he was made an associate of the Royal Canadian Academy of Arts (RCA). In 1904, he received a silver medal at the Canadian exhibition at the Louisiana Purchase Exposition. He was elected vice-president of the RCA in 1907 and president in 1909. In 1916, he was made a Companion of the Order of St Michael and St George.

Artworks 
 La Vieille Fileuse, île d'Orléans, 1883, Musée national des beaux-arts du Québec
A Wreath of Flowers, 1884, National Gallery of Canada
La Femme au métier, 1885, Musée national des beaux-arts du Québec
 In the Orchard (Spring), 1892, National Gallery of Canada
Early Moonrise in September, 1899, National Gallery of Canada
Ile aux Coudres, c. 1900, National Gallery of Canada
 La Vallée Saint-François, île d'Orléans, 1903, Musée national des beaux-arts du Québec
Evening, 1907, National Gallery of Canada
Near Louisbourg, Cape Breton, N. S., c. 1909, National Gallery of Canada
A Young Lady, c. 1910, National Gallery of Canada
Fog on the Coast, 1914, National Gallery of Canada
 Octobre sur la rivière Beaudet, 1914, Musée national des beaux-arts du Québec
 Jeune Fille au chapeau bleu (La Breloque), 1916, Musée national des beaux-arts du Québec

Gallery

Footnotes

Bibliography 
 Anderson, Jocelyn (2020). William Brymner: Life & Work. Art Canada Institute. Retrieved December 11, 2020.
"William Brymner fonds" Queen's University Archives.

Prakash, A.K.(2015) Impressionism in Canada: A Journey of Rediscovery. Stuttgart: Arnoldsche Art Publishers, pp. 491-509. 
 

1855 births
1925 deaths
19th-century Canadian painters
Canadian male painters
20th-century Canadian painters
Académie Julian alumni
Canadian Companions of the Order of St Michael and St George
People from Greenock
Lisgar Collegiate Institute alumni
Canadian Impressionist painters
Members of the Royal Canadian Academy of Arts